Bernard Hayward Pierce (born May 10, 1990) is a former American football running back. He played college football for Temple University. He was drafted by the Baltimore Ravens in the third round of the 2012 NFL Draft.

Early years
Pierce attended Glen Mills Schools in Glen Mills, Pennsylvania. He played football and ran track. Pierce also attended Welsh Valley Middle School in Penn Valley, Pennsylvania. He was a second-team Class AAAA All-State selection as a junior. As a senior, he rushed for 1,578 yards and 26 touchdowns, and also scored five two-point conversions. He led Delaware County with 143.4 rushing yards per game.

Pierce was also on the school's track team, where he competed as a sprinter. He placed third in the 60 meters at the 2009 Indoor State Championships, recording a personal-best time of 6.98 seconds. As a senior, he ran a career-best time of 10.6 seconds in the 100 meters, the fastest time in the state that year. He also ran the 200 meters in 22.34 seconds.

College career
Following his high school career, Pierce signed on to play football at Temple. While at Temple, Pierce was a student in the School of Communications and Theater and majored in Communications.

In 2009, Pierce won the Mid-American Conference freshman of the year award after rushing for 1,361 yards and 16 touchdowns.

After a strong week 3 performance against Connecticut, Pierce was named MAC Performer of the Week. He rushed for 169 yards and 3 touchdowns in the game. Through 10 games in the 2010 season, Pierce had 728 yards and 10 touchdowns.

In a blowout win over Maryland, Pierce scored a career-high 5 touchdowns in the 38-7 win.  He finished the game with 147 yards on 32 carries to go along with the five scores. That season, Pierce earned Eastern College Athletic Conference (ECAC) FBS Offensive Player of the Year honors and led Temple to its first bowl game win in 32 years, a 37-15 victory over the Wyoming Cowboys in the New Mexico Bowl.

Professional career

2012 NFL Combine

Baltimore Ravens

2012 season
The Baltimore Ravens traded up to take Pierce in the 3rd round of the 2012 NFL Draft.
Pierce would become a great complement to starting running back Ray Rice. Pierce scored his first touchdown of his professional career against the Cleveland Browns in Week 9 on November 4, 2012 on a 12-yard run. In Week 16, he ran for 123 yards on 14 carries against the New York Giants, including a 78-yard run from scrimmage. On January 6, 2013, in the Wild Card playoff game against the Indianapolis Colts, he ran for 103 yards on 13 carries. On February 3, 2013, the Ravens defeated the San Francisco 49ers 34-31 in Super Bowl XLVII, earning Pierce his first Super Bowl ring in his rookie year. He rushed for 33 yards on 12 attempts in the win.

2013 season
Pierce scored his second career rushing touchdown on a 5-yard run in Week 2 against the Cleveland Browns. He would then get a third rushing touchdown the next week against the Houston Texans in a 30-9 victory.

Six weeks into the 2013 season, Pierce was the Ravens leading rusher. He had 206 yards on 73 carries while only averaging 2.8 yards per carry.

2014 season
Bernard became a backup — along with Lorenzo Taliaferro — to Justin Forsett for the Ravens during the 2014 NFL season after Ray Rice was cut and suspended for an off-season altercation with his wife.
He scored his first rushing touchdown of the season against the Tampa Bay Buccaneers.

On March 18, 2015, Pierce was pulled over by police at 2am for speeding at 55 mph in a zone with a 35 mph speed limit. He failed the subsequent field sobriety test, as he was unable to walk in a straight line for more than two yards. Pierce was subsequently released from the Ravens later that day.

Jacksonville Jaguars
On March 19, 2015, Pierce was claimed off waivers by the Jacksonville Jaguars. He was placed on injured reserve on December 7, 2015.

New York Jets
Pierce was signed by the New York Jets on July 27, 2016. The Jets placed Pierce on their injured reserve list on August 16, 2016. He had been battling a hamstring injury throughout training camp. The Jets and Pierce reached an injury settlement and he was released from the reserve list on August 20, 2016.

Denver Broncos
Pierce signed a reserve/future contract with the Broncos on January 2, 2017. On August 21, 2017, he was released by the Broncos.

Flag football
In 2018, Pierce played as a member of the Roadrunners led by retired quarterback, Michael Vick, in the American Flag Football League.

Career statistics
Source:

See also
 List of Division I FBS rushing touchdown leaders

References

External links
Jacksonville Jaguars bio
Baltimore Ravens bio

1990 births
Living people
American football running backs
Denver Broncos players
Baltimore Ravens players
Jacksonville Jaguars players
New York Jets players
People from Ardmore, Pennsylvania
Players of American football from Pennsylvania
Sportspeople from Delaware County, Pennsylvania
Sportspeople from Montgomery County, Pennsylvania
Temple Owls football players